Caroline Link (born 2 June 1964) is a German TV and film director and screenwriter.

She is best known for directing critically acclaimed Beyond Silence, which was nominated for an Academy Award for Best International Feature Film, and for directing Nowhere in Africa, which won an Academy Award for Best International Feature Film and was nominated for a Golden Globe Award.

Life and work

Caroline Link is the daughter of Jürgen and Ilse Link. From 1986 to 1990 she studied at the University of Television and Film Munich (HFF), and then worked as an assistant director and script writer.

Link's early work includes the short film Bunte Blumen, from 1988.  She was a co-director on the documentary film Das Glück zum Anfassen (1989).  For Bavaria Film, she wrote two screenplays to the detective series Der Fahnder (The Investigators).

Caroline Link grew up in a small town outside of Frankfurt, Germany in 1968. Despite her family giving her a strong moral compass, they were a "non intellectual and non artistic family." Link first became interested in pursuing filmmaking after being a nanny in America, when she came back to Germany she was working on set as an extra and engaged with a camera man. She thought it would be an interesting profession, she recognized that being a camera women was going to be hard but after studying what they did on set as an extra she was able to get herself an internship in the film industry. Link enjoyed working in the film industry but wanted the ability to create and express her politics.

Link's first feature film, Jenseits der Stille (Beyond Silence, 1996) was nominated for the Academy Award as Best Foreign Language Film, and attracted attention for its portrayal of a family with deaf parents.  Her second feature film was Annaluise and Anton (1999), based on a novel by Erich Kästner.  Her third feature film, Nirgendwo in Afrika (Nowhere in Africa, 2001), adapted by Link from the autobiographical novel by Stefanie Zweig and shot on location in Kenya, received the Academy Award for Best Foreign Language Film as well winning the German Film Award (Deutscher Filmpreis) in five categories, including Best Fiction Film.

Beyond Silence 
Beyond Silence was Link's first break through, was nominated for the Oscar for Best Foreign Language Film and brought her global recognition. Beyond Silence illustrates the struggles of the main character Lara, a child of deaf adults (CODA), among communicating with her deaf parents Martin and Kai. Link uses the theme of silence in her story as an allegory for censorship, generational trauma and oppression in the heart of Germany society. " This isn’t really a movie about deafness, Beyond Silence. It’s about deafness on the surface, of course, but the emotional substance is about communication in a family. I always try to speak about a universal emotion that most viewers will know and understand. So with Beyond Silence, I knew I wanted to make a movie about a father and a daughter – a daughter who loves her father very much but who feels drawn to a completely different world. This I knew from my own life, and this is what I wanted to write about before I knew I’d make a movie about a deaf family."

“Women tend to worry a lot about their perception. We want to be nice people. But it’s not always possible to be calm, sweet and understanding when you are in a leading position or if you really try to get something that you need for your creative idea. I had to learn, that it is ok for a woman to WANT something, to be the boss and to sometimes even be aggressive”.

Personal life 
Link lives with her partner, the film director Dominik Graf, and their daughter, who was born in 2002.

Filmography

Films

TV

Awards and nominations

Further reading

References

External links
 

1964 births
Film people from Hesse
People from Bad Nauheim
Living people
University of Television and Film Munich alumni
German women film directors
Directors of Best Foreign Language Film Academy Award winners
Best Director German Film Award winners
Officers Crosses of the Order of Merit of the Federal Republic of Germany